The following highways are numbered 966:

United States